Clifton Heights is a hamlet  in the town of Hamburg in Erie County, New York, United States. It is located within the Wanakah census-designated place.

References

Hamlets in New York (state)
Hamlets in Erie County, New York